The Alabama Women's Hall of Fame honors the achievements of women associated with the U.S. state of Alabama. Established in 1970, the first women were inducted the following year. The museum is located in Bean Hall, a former Carnegie Library, on the campus of Judson College in Marion, Alabama. It became a state agency in 1975 by an act of the Alabama Legislature. The organization is governed by an eleven-member board. They are elected to three-year terms with a minimum of one board member from the fields of art, business, community service, education, law, medicine, politics, religion, and science. In addition to the board, the President of Judson College and Governor of Alabama both serve as voting members.

Inductees

Footnotes

References

Further reading

External links
Encyclopedia of Alabama
University of Alabama Press
Alabama Women's Hall of Fame official site

Alabama culture
Women's halls of fame
Feminism and history
Lists of American women
Women's museums in Alabama
Museums in Perry County, Alabama
State agencies of Alabama
Halls of fame in Alabama
State halls of fame in the United States
Awards established in 1970
Biographical museums in Alabama
History museums in Alabama
History of women in Alabama
1970 establishments in Alabama
Marion, Alabama
Lists of people from Alabama